The year 1943 in archaeology involved some significant events.

Excavations
 Excavations at Olmec site of La Venta by Matthew Stirling end.
 Start of excavations at El Tajín by José Garcia Payon.
 Start of excavations at Hassuna by a team from the Iraqi Directorate General of Antiquities led by Seton Lloyd (continue to 1945).

Publications
Christopher and Jacquetta Hawkes - Prehistoric Britain.

Finds
 May 20 - Luttra Woman, a skeletonised early Neolithic bog body, is found in Sweden.
 First finds of Gaudo culture in Campania.
 Cache of late-medieval wax votive images at Exeter Cathedral in England.
 "Greta", a skull found in the midlands of England, is believed to be the oldest in Britain, dated to 14,000 years  BP, until redated to the late 11th century CE in 2021.

Miscellaneous
 The National Trust purchases Avebury from Alexander Keiller.
 November - Max von Oppenheim's private archaeological museum in Berlin is destroyed by bombing.

Births
 July 2 - Peter Woodman, Irish archaeologist (d. 2017)
 July 20 - Gordon Hillman, British archaeobotanist (d. 2018)
 December 17 - Heidemarie Koch, German Iranologist (d. 2022)

Deaths
 April 7 - Auguste Audollent, French historian, archaeologist and Latin epigrapher (b. 1864)
 September 5 - Aleš Hrdlička, Czech-American anthropologist (b. 1869)
 October 26 - Aurel Stein, Hungarian-British Central Asian archaeologist (b. 1862)

References

Archaeology
Archaeology
Archaeology by year